The M43 motorway is a Hungarian motorway that runs from the junction with the M5 Motorway west of Szeged to the Romanian border at Nagylak via Makó. Since 2015 it connects Hungary with Romania as the first border crossing on a motorway between the two countries.

Openings timeline
1: Szeged; M5 – Szeged-north (3 km): 2005.12.10.
2/A: Szeged-north – Szeged-Sándorfalva (4.4 km): 2010.04.01.
2/B: Szeged-Sándorfalva – Szeged-Hódmezővásárhely (3.3 km): 2010.10.07.
2/C: Szeged-Hódmezővásárhely – Makó (23.9 km): 2011.04.09.
3: Makó – Csanádpalota ( border) (23.1 km): 2015.07.11.

Junctions, exits and rest area

 The route is full length motorway.

Maintenance
The operation and maintenance of the road by Hungarian Public Road Nonprofit Pte Ltd Co. This activity is provided by this highway engineer.
 near Makó, kilometre trench 35

Payment
From February 1, 2016, the M43 motorway is fully charged. The motorway can be used instead of the national sticker with the following county stickers:

European Route(s)

Significant artifacts
 Bridge
 Ferenc Móra Bridge over Tisza river

See also 

 Roads in Hungary
 Transport in Hungary
 International E-road network

External links 

National Toll Payment Services Plc. (in Hungarian, some information also in English)
 Hungarian Public Road Non-Profit Ltd. (Magyar Közút Nonprofit Zrt.)
 National Infrastructure Developer Ltd.

43